Arthur Gaebelein (29 March 1891 – 4 September 1964) was a German international footballer.

References

1891 births
1964 deaths
Association football forwards
German footballers
Germany international footballers